Rafael Nadal and Tommy Robredo defeated Jonathan Erlich and Andy Ram in the final, 7–6(7–3), 4–6, 6–3 win the Doubles title at the 2004 Chennai Open.

Julian Knowle and Michael Kohlmann were the defending champions, but lost in the quarterfinals to Mariusz Fyrstenberg and Marcin Matkowski.

Seeds

  Jonathan Erlich /  Andy Ram (final)
  Julian Knowle /  Michael Kohlmann (quarterfinals)
  Jordan Kerr /  Jim Thomas (first round)
  Petr Luxa /  David Škoch (quarterfinals)

Draw

References
 2004 Chennai Open Doubles Draw

2004 Chennai Open
Doubles
Maharashtra Open